Anna Malá (17 May 1886 – 19 April 1948) was a Czechoslovakian politician. In 1920 she was one of the first group of women elected to the Chamber of Deputies.

Biography
Malá was born in Nimburg in Austria-Hungary in 1886. Prior to entering politics, she was a civil servant in Vinohrady district of Prague.

She was a Czechoslovak Social Democratic Workers' Party candidate in the 1920 parliamentary elections and was one of sixteen women elected to parliament. After the party split in 1921, she joined to the newly formed Communist Party of Czechoslovakia.

After leaving parliament in 1925, she returned to working as clerk and also contributed articles to Rudé právo, the Communist Party's newspaper. She died in Prague in 1948.

References

1886 births
People from Nymburk
Czechoslovak civil servants
Czechoslovak women in politics
Members of the Chamber of Deputies of Czechoslovakia (1920–1925)
Czech Social Democratic Party politicians
Communist Party of Czechoslovakia politicians
1948 deaths